The 1974 Minnesota gubernatorial election took place on November 5, 1974. The 1974 election was the first election where the Governor and Lieutenant Governor ran on the same ticket. Minnesota Democratic–Farmer–Labor Party candidate Wendell Anderson defeated Republican Party of Minnesota challenger John W. Johnson.  Anderson won every single county in the election, becoming the first person to do so since Governor J.A.A. Burnquist in 1916. This was the last time until 1994 that a candidate would win every single county in an election.

Results

External links
 http://www.sos.state.mn.us/home/index.asp?page=653
 http://www.sos.state.mn.us/home/index.asp?page=657

Gubernatorial
1974
Minnesota
November 1974 events in the United States